The Kalsar College Of Engineering is a private tertiary education institution near Chennai, India, affiliated to Anna University. It was founded in 1998 in Sriperumpudur, Tamil Nadu and is approved by the All India Council for Technical Education and the Government of Tamil Nadu.

External links
 Kalsar College Of Engineering official site

Engineering colleges in Tamil Nadu
Colleges affiliated to Anna University
Universities and colleges in Kanchipuram district
Educational institutions established in 1998
1998 establishments in Tamil Nadu